The Nicholls Colonels women's basketball team represents Nicholls State University in Thibodaux, Louisiana, United States. The school's team currently competes in the Southland Conference, which is part of the National Collegiate Athletic Association's Division I. Nicholls' first women's basketball team was fielded in 1974–1975. The team plays its home games at 3,800-seat Stopher Gymnasium and are coached by DoBee Plaisance.

Championships

Conference championships 
Tournament
Southland: 2018

History

NCAA tournament
Nicholls State has appeared in the NCAA Women's Division I Basketball Tournament once The Colonels have a 0–1 record.

See also
 Nicholls Colonels

References

External links
 

 
Basketball teams established in 1974
1974 establishments in Louisiana